Rajeev Ram is the defending champion, but lost in the quarterfinals to Jan Mertl.
Daniel Brands won the title, defeating Ernests Gulbis 7–6(7–0), 6–3 in the final.

Seeds

Draw

Finals

Top half

Bottom half

References
 Main Draw
 Qualifying Draw

2012 ATP Challenger Tour
2012 Singles